Lyubomir Bozhinov (born 16 May 1986) is a Bulgarian footballer who plays as a midfielder for Chernomorets Burgas. He primarily plays as a centre midfielder.

Career
Born in Burgas, Bozhinov was part of the Naftex youth squad, before he made his A PFG debut in a 0–0 away draw with Nesebar on 11 September 2004. The following 2005–06 season saw Bozhinov make 11 appearances for The Sheiks, but Naftex were relegated from the A PFG at the end of the campaign. During the 2006–07 season, on 15 October 2006, again against Nesebar he scored his first ever professional career goal in a 2–0 away win.

In 2008, he left Naftex Burgas for Chernomorets Burgas, but earned only 9 appearances in the A PFG during the 2008–09 season. In May 2009 Bozhinov joined the club's satellite team Chernomorets Pomorie.

In June 2011, after two seasons outside the A PFG, Bozhinov signed a contract with Lokomotiv Sofia. He left the club in early December, due to financial problems.

On 22 June 2017, Bozhinov signed with Pomorie for the third time in his career.

Career statistics
As of 1 June 2017

Awards
 Champion of B PFG 2013 (with Neftochimic Burgas)

References

1986 births
Living people
Sportspeople from Burgas
Bulgarian footballers
First Professional Football League (Bulgaria) players
Second Professional Football League (Bulgaria) players
PFC Chernomorets Burgas players
FC Pomorie players
FC Lokomotiv 1929 Sofia players
Neftochimic Burgas players
Association football midfielders